İmambağı is a village in the Jabrayil District of Azerbaijan. On 20 October 2020 President of Azerbaijan Ilham Aliyev announced that the village had been recaptured by the Azerbaijani forces during the 2020 Nagorno-Karabakh war.

References 

Populated places in Jabrayil District